The Peacock Mausoleum is a Victorian Gothic memorial to Richard Peacock (1820–1889), engineer and Liberal MP for Manchester, and to his son, Joseph Peacock.  It is situated in the cemetery of Brookfield Unitarian Church, Gorton, Manchester. The mausoleum was designed by the prolific Manchester architect Thomas Worthington. It was listed Grade II* on the National Heritage List for England on 3 October 1974.

Nikolaus Pevsner's The Buildings of England describes the memorial as "a large three-bay shrine of white stone.  Steep roof and statues at the corners – an engineer, blacksmith, draughtsman and architect, supposedly a portrayal of Worthington himself." Peacock, a partner in the locomotive engineering firm of Beyer, Peacock & Company also paid for the construction of the Brookfield Unitarian Church.

See also

Listed buildings in Manchester-M18

Notes

References

External links
 Website featuring an early photo of the mausoleum

Buildings and structures completed in 1876
Grade II* listed buildings in Manchester
Grade II* listed monuments and memorials
Mausoleums in England
Monuments and memorials in Manchester